Bienotherium is an extinct genus of cynodonts from the Early Jurassic of China discovered by  Bian Meinian (Mei Nien Bien). Despite its size, it is closely related to Lufengia, and is the largest tritylodont from the Lufeng Formation in China.

Bienotherium had four incisors, no canines, and back molar-like teeth, which it used to chew tough plant material.

Description
Bienotherium is defined as being big and robust compared to other tritylodonts, and also by exposed  maxillaries in the skull, an unusually long diastema and thin zygomatic bone.

References

Further reading
Chinese Fossil Vertebrates, p. 133

Jurassic synapsids of Asia
Prehistoric cynodont genera
Fossil taxa described in 1940
Taxa named by Yang Zhongjian
Tritylodontids
Hettangian genus first appearances
Sinemurian genus extinctions